German submarine U-484 was a Type VIIC U-boat of Nazi Germany's Kriegsmarine during World War II.

She carried out one patrol. She sank no ships.

She was sunk by British warships northwest of Ireland on 9 September 1944.

Design
German Type VIIC submarines were preceded by the shorter Type VIIB submarines. U-484 had a displacement of  when at the surface and  while submerged. She had two shafts and two  propellers.

U-484 was fitted with five  torpedo tubes (four fitted at the bow and one at the stern), fourteen torpedoes, one  SK C/35 naval gun, (220 rounds), one  Flak M42 and two twin  C/30 anti-aircraft guns. The boat had a complement of between forty-four and sixty.

Service history
The submarine was laid down on 27 March 1943 at the Deutsche Werke in Kiel as yard number 319, launched on 20 November and commissioned on 19 January 1944 under the command of Korvettenkapitän Wolf-Axel Schaefer.

She served with the 5th U-boat Flotilla from 19 January 1944 for training and the 3rd flotilla from 1 August for operations.

Patrol and loss
U-484s only patrol was preceded by a short trip from Kiel in Germany to Horten Naval Base (south of Oslo), in Norway. The patrol itself began with the boat's departure from Horten on 14 August 1944. She passed through the gap separating Iceland and the Faroe Islands and was shortly afterwards attacked and sunk by depth charges dropped by two British warships, the corvette  and the frigate  on 9 September 1944.

Fifty-two men went down with U-484; there were no survivors.

Previously recorded fate
Sunk on 9 September 1944 by depth charges from two Canadian warships, the corvette  and the frigate . This attack was on a non-submarine target.

References

Bibliography

External links

German Type VIIC submarines
U-boats commissioned in 1944
U-boats sunk in 1944
U-boats sunk by depth charges
U-boats sunk by British warships
1943 ships
Ships built in Kiel
World War II submarines of Germany
Ships lost with all hands
World War II shipwrecks in the Atlantic Ocean
Maritime incidents in September 1944